Watchorn Provincial Park is located in Interlake Region of Manitoba, Canada on the eastern shore of Lake Manitoba.

See also
List of protected areas of Manitoba

References

External links
Watchorn Provincial Park

Provincial parks of Manitoba
Protected areas of Manitoba